Kniphofia reflexa is a species of plant which is native to Cameroon and Nigeria.  Its natural habitat is swamps. It is threatened by habitat loss.

References

Flora of Cameroon
Flora of Nigeria
Plants described in 1967
reflexa
Endangered plants
Taxonomy articles created by Polbot